Harriet Ward Sanborn Grosvenor was an early American writer, poet, and author of fifteen books.

Personal life
She was born in Hampton Falls, New Hampshire on January 22, 1823, the daughter of Thayer S. Sanborn (1797–1874) and Deborah Ward (1804–1850). In 1843 married Edwin Prescott Grosvenor, M.D., of Newburyport, Massachusetts, where the couple resided after the wedding.

Harriet Grosvenor's son, Edwin A. Grosvenor, became a noted professor of history at Amherst College and her grandson, Gilbert H. Grosvenor, was the first employee and longtime President of the National Geographic Society and Editor of its magazine.

Career
At the age of 24, she wrote My Sister Emily, published by the Massachusetts Sabbath School Society. After her husband's death in December 1856, Harriet supported her family largely by writing, which was an unusual achievement for a woman at the time. She also wrote hymns and broadsides.

Published works
Her published works include:
 My Sister Emily, 1847 
 A Sabbath in My Early Home, 1850  
 Unfading Flowers, 1851  
 The Little Word No: Or, Indecision of Character, 1853  
 Agnes Thornton: Or, School Duties, 1854  
 Helen Spencer: Or, Home Duties, 1854  
 Right and Wrong, 1855  
 Ellen Dacre: Or, Life at Aunt Hester's, 1858  
 Capt. Russel's Watchword: Or, "I'll Try," 1859  
 Life's Lessons, 1859  
 The Old Red House, 1860  
 The Drunkard's Daughter, 1860  
 Blind Ethan, A Story for Boys, 1860  
 Why the Mill Was Stopped, 1861  
 Climbing the Mountain, 1862  
 Noonday: A Life Sketch, 1863

References

External links
 Library of Congress authority file
 OCLC WorldCat Identity

1823 births
1863 deaths
19th-century American women writers
19th-century American writers
Writers from Massachusetts
Writers from Newburyport, Massachusetts